Grinspan syndrome is a syndrome characterized by presence of the triad: essential hypertension, diabetes mellitus, and oral lichen planus.

Oral lichen planus is thought to be a result of the drugs used for treatment of hypertension and diabetes mellitus but this is not confirmed.

References

Syndromes affecting the endocrine system
Oral mucosal pathology
Medical triads